Robert Mason Wiley (May 30, 1955 – October 7, 1994) was an author who co-wrote The Official Preppy Handbook and Inside Oscar: The Unofficial History of the Academy Awards.

Biography 
Wiley was born in Nash County, North Carolina on May 30, 1955. He attended Episcopal High School in Alexandria, Virginia and graduated from Columbia University in 1977.

While working for the Columbia Daily Spectator, he met future film critic and historian Damien Bona, who later became his writing collaborator.

He was one of the four authors of The Official Preppy Handbook, a humorous, best-selling reference book on prep culture published in 1980. As the only southerner among the writers, Wiley included Southern prep culture to offset the predominant New England vibes.

In 1986, he and Bona wrote a year-by-year account of the Academy Awards that took 4 years of writing and research, with a fourth edition published in 1993.

Wiley also was a critic for such publications as the New York Times, Los Angeles Times, New York Newsday, Cosmopolitan, Time, Entertainment Weekly and others.

On October 7, 1994, Wiley died from the complications of AIDS.

References 

1955 births
1994 deaths
AIDS-related deaths in New York (state)
People from Nash County, North Carolina
Columbia College (New York) alumni
Episcopal High School (Alexandria, Virginia) alumni
American male non-fiction writers
American film critics
Academy Awards
Journalists from New York City
American LGBT journalists
20th-century LGBT people